Gustav Schmidt may refer to:

Gustav Schmidt (general) (1894–1943), German military officer, lieutenant general in World War II
Gustav Schmidt (canoeist) (1926–2016), German canoeist
Gustav Schmidt (composer) (1816–1882), German composer, see Philharmonisches Staatsorchester Mainz